Migliorini is an Italian surname. Notable people with the surname include:

 Andrea Migliorini (born 1988), Italian footballer playing for Melbourne Heart
 Barry Migliorini (born 1966), American Professional Basketball Coach
 Bruno Migliorini (1896–1975), Italian linguist and philologist
 Giovanni Migliorini (born 1931), retired Italian professional football player
 Marco Migliorini (born 1992), Italian footballer playing for Salernitana
 Renato Migliorini (1926–2008), Brazilian physician, biomedical scientist, biochemist and full professor of physiology

See also
 5246 Migliorini, Mars-crossing asteroid discovered on July 26, 1979

Italian-language surnames